The Women's 1500 metres at the 2010 Commonwealth Games as part of the athletics programme was held at the Jawaharlal Nehru Stadium on Thursday 7 October till Friday 8 October 2010.

The top four runners in each of the initial two heats plus the next four fastest runners from across the heats also qualified for the final.

Records

Heats
First 4 in each heat (Q) and 4 best performers (q) advance to the Semifinals.

Heat 1

Heat 2

Final

External links
2010 Commonwealth Games - Athletics
Video of 1500m final

Women's 1500 metres
2010
2010 in women's athletics